Adolf Reubke (December 6, 1805 – March 3, 1875) was a German organ builder.

He was born in Halberstadt. His organ building business was based in Hausneindorf and he built instruments at the Jakobikirche in Magdeburg (1853-58), the Gewandhaus in Leipzig (1860; home of the Leipzig Gewandhaus Orchestra) and Magdeburg Cathedral (1861).

From 1860, Adolf's business was run in partnership with his son Emil (1836-1884), who continued to run the business until Emil's death in 1884, when Ernst Röver took over. Adolf Reubke outlived another son, the composer Julius Reubke.  His third son, Otto (1842-1913), was also a composer, pianist and organist.

Reubke died in Hausneindorf.

1805 births
1875 deaths
People from Halberstadt
German pipe organ builders
People from the Province of Saxony
Articles lacking sources from June 2009
All articles lacking sources
19th-century German musicians
Musical instrument manufacturing companies of Germany